The Breaking Point is a 1950 American film noir crime drama directed by Michael Curtiz and the second film adaptation of the 1937 Ernest Hemingway novel To Have and Have Not. (the first one having featured Humphrey Bogart and Lauren Bacall). It stars John Garfield in his penultimate film role and Patricia Neal.

Plot
Harry Morgan (John Garfield) is a sport-fishing boat captain whose business is on the skids and whose family is feeling the economic pinch. He begins to work with a shady lawyer, Duncan (Wallace Ford), who persuades him to smuggle eight Chinese men from Mexico into California in his boat, the Sea Queen. Harry also meets a tramp by the name of Leona Charles (Patricia Neal). When his plan with Duncan goes wrong, Harry comes even more under the influence of the lawyer, who blackmails him into helping the escape of a gang of crooks, who pull a racetrack heist, by using his fishing boat to get them away from authorities. Harry convinces himself that his illegal activities will financially help his family. His wife, Lucy (Phyllis Thaxter), suspects Harry is breaking the law and urges him to stop for the sake of the family. Harry refuses and walks out.

As Harry waits for Duncan and the crooks on his boat, Harry's partner, Wesley Park (Juano Hernandez), arrives. Not wanting Wesley around when the crooks arrive, Harry tries to send him on an errand. The crooks arrive before Wesley leaves, though, and kill him. Harry is horrified, but is forced at gunpoint to transport the crooks out to open sea without drawing the attention of the Coast Guard. Harry also learns that Duncan was killed during the escape from the heist. Wesley's body is dumped overboard. Harry uses a ploy to get his hands on two guns he had hidden away prior to the journey and kills all the crooks in a dramatic shootout.

Harry, however, is critically wounded. Authorities find his boat the next day and tow it to port. Lucy rushes to Harry's side and tries to convince Harry to allow his arm to be amputated to save his life. Speaking with difficulty, Harry reaffirms his love for Lucy and then closes his eyes. Paramedics arrive and carry Harry's motionless body into an ambulance. As they walk away from the wharf, Lucy pleads with the Coast Guard officer for assurance that Harry will live. The officer says nothing, as sorrowful music plays on the soundtrack. In the final scene, Wesley's son, who was briefly introduced earlier in the film, stands alone on the dock looking around for his father.

Cast
 John Garfield as Harry Morgan
 Patricia Neal as Leona Charles
 Phyllis Thaxter as Lucy Morgan
 Juano Hernández as Wesley Park
 Wallace Ford as F.R. Duncan
 Edmon Ryan as Rogers
 Ralph Dumke as Hannagan
 Guy Thomajan as Danny
 William Campbell as Concho
 Sherry Jackson as Amelia Morgan
 Donna Jo Boyce as Connie Morgan
 Victor Sen Yung as Mr. Sing

Reception
Bosley Crowther of The New York Times, lauded the film when it was first released. He wrote, "Warner Brothers, which already has taken one feeble swing and a cut at Ernest Hemingway's memorable story of a tough guy, To Have and Have Not, finally has got hold of that fable and socked it for a four-base hit in a film called The Breaking Point, which came to the Strand yesterday. All of the character, color and cynicism of Mr. Hemingway's lean and hungry tale are wrapped up in this realistic picture, and John Garfield is tops in the principal role ... Some solid production and photography along the coast and in actual harbors for small boats round out a film which is gripping and pictorially genuine."

References

External links
 
 
 
 
 
 
The Breaking Point: All at Sea an essay by Stephanie Zacharek at the Criterion Collection

1950 films
1950 crime drama films
American crime drama films
American black-and-white films
Remakes of American films
1950s English-language films
Film noir
Films based on American novels
Films based on works by Ernest Hemingway
Films directed by Michael Curtiz
Films scored by Max Steiner
Films about the United States Coast Guard
Films with screenplays by Ranald MacDougall
Warner Bros. films
1950s American films